Henri-Camille Danger (1857 – 1939) was a French artist known for history paintings, allegorical and mythological subjects, genre scenes, landscapes and designs for tapestries.

Early life and education

Henri-Camille was the son of Jules Félix Camille Danger, a tailor, and Marie Joséphine Tacheux.  He studied at the École des Beaux-Arts under Jean-Léon Gérôme and Aimé Millet, and exhibited his work at the Paris Salon from 1886 to 1937.

Danger was awarded the Prix de Rome in 1887 for his painting "The Anger of Achilles Relieved by Minerva".  This allowed him to study in Villa Medici between 1888 and 1891.

Legacy

He debuted at the Salon of 1898 with "The Great Artisans of Arbitration and Peace", boldly dedicated it to Alexander III of Russia.

A member of the Société des Artistes Français from 1899, he won a silver medal at the Exposition Universelle (1900), and was made a Chevalier of the Légion d'Honneur in 1903.  His salon submissions included historical subjects such as "The Hague Conference" (1903), allegories such as "The Great Designers of Arbitration and Peace", mythological subjects such as "Venus with Two Gifts" (1937), more intimate genre scenes, and landscapes of Italy.

He also produced sketches for tapestries for the Gobelins Manufactory, and illuminations in 15th-century style.

In 1999 his painting "Aphrodite and Eros" was sold for GBP 10,350.  A year later "Allegory of industry and labor" fetched US$11,750.  Both sales took place at Christie's.

His works can be found in private collections, at the Beaux-Arts de Paris, Musée d'Orsay, Petit Palais, Hôtel de Ville, Paris, Musée des Beaux-Arts de Tours and others.

Gallery

Notes

References

Sources 

 "Benezit Dictionary of Artists" 2006

External links 

 Musée d'Orsay:  Danger
 Ask Art:  Henri-Camille Danger
 Artvee: Henri-Camille Danger
 Dorotheum GmbH & Co KG:  Henri-Camille Danger
 The French Academy in Rome - Villa Medici:  Henri-Camille Danger

19th-century French painters
20th-century French painters
French male painters
1857 births
1939 deaths
19th-century French male artists